Rewilding, or re-wilding, activities are conservation efforts aimed at restoring and protecting natural processes and wilderness areas. Rewilding is a form of ecological restoration with an emphasis on recreating an area's natural, uncultivated state. This may require active human intervention to achieve.  Approaches can include removing human artefacts such as dams or bridges, connecting wilderness areas, and protecting or reintroducing apex predators and keystone species.

The general goal is to move toward a wilder natural ecosystem that will involve less active forms of natural resource management. Rewilding efforts can aim to create ecosystems requiring passive management. Successful long term rewilding projects can need little ongoing human attention, as successful reintroduction of keystone species creates a self-regulatory and self-sustaining stable ecosystem, possibly with near pre-human levels of biodiversity.

While rewilding initiatives can be controversial, the United Nations have listed rewilding as one of several methods needed to achieve massive scale restoration of natural ecosystems, which they say must be accomplished by 2030 as part of the 30x30 campaign.

Origin
The word rewilding was coined by members of the grassroots network Earth First!, appearing in print by 1990, and was refined by conservation biologists Michael Soulé and Reed Noss in a paper published in 1998. According to Soulé and Noss, rewilding is a conservation method based on "cores, corridors, and carnivores." The concepts of cores, corridors, and carnivores were developed further in 1999. Dave Foreman subsequently wrote a full-length book about rewilding as a conservation strategy.

History
Rewilding was developed as a method to preserve functional ecosystems and reduce biodiversity loss, incorporating research in island biogeography and the ecological role of large carnivores. In 1967, The Theory of Island Biogeography by Robert H. MacArthur and Edward O. Wilson established the importance of considering the size and isolation of wildlife conservation areas, stating that protected areas remained vulnerable to extinctions if small and isolated. In 1987, William D. Newmark's study of extinctions in national parks in North America added weight to the theory. The publications intensified debates on conservation approaches. With the creation of the Society for Conservation Biology in 1985, conservationists began to focus on reducing habitat loss and fragmentation.

Practice and interest in rewilding grew rapidly in the first two decades of the 21st century. An early and groundbreaking initiative was led in the United Kingdom, by Neil A Hill, an ecologist and early proponent of non-interventional land management. His published work on the Landscape Enhancement Initiative went on to inform a number of European projects under the Interreg IIIb tier. He undertook later work with the Iberian Lynx that led to large scale rewilding initiatives in the Dehesa/Montado ecosystems. An early conceptual framework was further provided by Frans Vera's wood-pasture hypothesis, which hypothesizes a primary role for herbivores in shaping prehistoric European landscapes.

Supporters of rewilding initiatives range from individuals, small land owners, local non-governmental organizations and authorities, to national governments and international non-governmental organizations such as the International Union for Conservation of Nature. While small scale efforts are generally well regarded, like the LEI AND lynx projects mentioned above, the increased popularity of rewilding has generated controversary, especially regarding large scale projects. These have attracted criticism from academics, practicing conservationists, government officials and business people.
In a June 2021 report for the launch of the UN Decade on Ecosystem Restoration, the UN listed rewilding as one of several restoration methods which they state should be used for the ecosystem restoration of over 1 billion hectares (a total area bigger than China).

Rewilding and climate change 
Rewilding can mitigate global climate change.  An example of this would be rewilding pasture land, thereby reducing the number of cows and sheep and increasing the number of trees.

Also, restoring megafauna may have a positive impact on biodiversity, and may also increase public enthusiasm for biodiversity. One rewilding effort specifically focused on mitigating global climate change is restoring Pleistocene megafauna.  By restoring large herbivores, greenhouse gas levels may be lowered.  Grazers may also reduce fire frequency by eating flammable brush, which would, in turn, lower greenhouse gas emissions, lower aerosol levels in the atmosphere, and alter the planet's albedo.  Browsing and grazing also accelerates nutrient cycling, which may increase local plant productivity, and maintain ecosystem productivity specifically in grassy biomes.  Megafauna also aid with carbon storage.  In fact, the loss of megafauna that eat fruits may be responsible for up to 10% of lost carbon storage in forests.

Rewilding Elements
Rewilding aims to restore three key ecological processes: trophic complexity, dispersal, and stochastic disturbances.

Keystone species

Keystone species are animals which interact strongly with the environment.

Ecosystem engineers 
One example of ecosystem engineers are ground disrupting powerful animals that push over trees, trample shrubs and dig holes. These ensure that trees in grasslands do not become dominant.  Some of these species currently being used in rewilding efforts include beaver, elephants, bison, elk, cattle (as proxies for the extinct aurochs). These species also disperse seeds in their dung.

Pig species, originally wild boar, dig creating soil where new plants can grow.

Beavers are another important example of ecosystem engineers.  The dams they build create micro ecosystems that can be used as spawning beds for salmon and collect invertebrates for the salmon fry to feed on. The dams also create wetlands for plant, insect, and bird life. Specific trees, such as alder, birch, cottonwood, and willow, are important to beaver's diets and should be encouraged to grow in areas near beavers.

Predators 
Predators may be required to ensure that browsing and grazing animals are kept from over-breeding/over-feeding, destroying vegetation complexity, as may be concluded from mass-starvations which happened in Oostvaardersplassen. Some examples of these predators are Eurasian lynx and wolves. However, although it is generally undebated that predators occupy an important role in ecosystems, there is no general agreement about whether wild predators keep herbivore populations in check, or whether their influence is of more subtle nature (see Ecology of fear). By analogy, wildebeest populations in the Serengeti are primarily controlled by food constraints despite the presence of many predators. The consequence is natural mass-starvation.

Rewilding in different locations
Both grassroots groups and major international conservation organizations have incorporated rewilding into projects to protect and restore large-scale core wilderness areas, corridors (or connectivity) between them, and apex predators, carnivores, or keystone species (species which interact strongly with the environment, such as elephant and beaver). Projects include the Yellowstone to Yukon Conservation Initiative in North America (also known as Y2Y) and the European Green Belt, built along the former Iron Curtain, transboundary projects, including those in southern Africa funded by the Peace Parks Foundation, community-conservation projects, such as the wildlife conservancies of Namibia and Kenya, and projects organized around ecological restoration, including Gondwana Link, regrowing native bush in a hotspot of endemism in southwest Australia, and the Area de Conservacion Guanacaste, restoring dry tropical forest and rainforest in Costa Rica.

North America

In North America, another major project aims to restore the prairie grasslands of the Great Plains. The American Prairie is reintroducing bison on private land in the Missouri Breaks region of north-central Montana, with the goal of creating a prairie preserve larger than Yellowstone National Park.

Dam removal has led to the restoration of many river systems in the Pacific Northwest. This has been done in an effort to restore salmon populations specifically but with other species in mind. As stated in an article on environmental law, "These dam removals provide perhaps the best example of large-scale environmental remediation in the twenty-first century. This restoration, however, has occurred on a case-by-case basis, without a comprehensive plan. The result has been to put into motion ongoing rehabilitation efforts in four distinct river basins: the Elwha and White Salmon in Washington and the Sandy and Rogue in Oregon."

South America

Argentina
In 1997, Douglas and Kristine Tompkins created "The Conservation Land Trust Argentina", a team of conservationists and scientists with the goal of transforming the Iberá Wetlands. Thanks to them, and to a donation of 195,094 ha made by Kristine, in 2018 an area was converted into a National Park, and the jaguar was reintroduced into it, a species that had been extinct in the region for seven decades. They also introduced anteaters and giant otters. Currently, the Rewilding Argentina Foundation is an organization that is dedicated, in addition to Iberá National Park, to the restoration of El Impenetrable National Park, in Chaco, Patagonia Park, in Santa Cruz, and the Patagonian coastal area in the province of Chubut.

Brazil
In Tijuca National Park (Rio de Janeiro state, Brazil), two important seed dispersers, the red-humped agouti and the brown howler monkey, were reintroduced between years 2010 and 2017. The goal of the reintroductions was to restore seed dispersal interactions between seed dispersing animals and fleshy-fruited trees. The agoutis and howler monkeys interacted with several plant and dung beetle species. Before reintroductions, the national park did not have large or intermediate -sized seed dispersers, meaning that the increased dispersal of tree seeds following the reintroductions can have a large effect on forest regeneration in the national park. The Tijuca National Park is part of heavily fragmented Atlantic Forest, where there is potential to restore many more seed dispersal interactions if seed dispersing mammals and birds are reintroduced to forest patches where the tree species diversity remains high.

Australia 
An organization called Rewilding Australia has formed which intends to restore various marsupials and other Australian animals which have been extirpated from the mainland, such as Eastern quolls and Tasmanian devils.

Europe 
In 2011, the 'Rewilding Europe' initiative was established with the aim of rewilding one million hectares of land in ten areas including the western Iberian Peninsula, Velebit, the Carpathians and the Danube delta by 2020, mostly abandoned farmland among other identified candidate sites. The present project considers only species that are still present in Europe, such as the Iberian lynx, Eurasian lynx, grey wolf, European jackal, brown bear, chamois, Iberian ibex, European bison, red deer, griffon vulture, cinereous vulture, Egyptian vulture, great white pelican and horned viper, along with a few primitive breeds of domestic horse/Przewalski's horse and cattle as proxies for the extinct tarpan and aurochs. Since 2012, Rewilding Europe has been heavily involved in the Tauros Programme, which seeks to create a breed of cattle that resembles the aurochs, the wild ancestors of domestic cattle, by selectively breeding existing breeds of cattle. Many projects also employ domestic water buffalo as a grazing proxy for the extinct European water buffalo.

Areas of rewilding include the Côa River, a Natura 2000 area.
European Wildlife, established in 2008, advocates the establishment of a European Centre of Biodiversity at the German–Austrian–Czech borders.

Austria 
In 2003 de Biosphärenpark Wienerwald was created in Austria. Within this area 37 kernzonen (core zones) covering 5,400 ha in total were designated areas free from human interference.

England
The term "re-wilding" has no universally agreed meaning within England or the UK. Rewilding Britain, the leading re-wilding advocacy charity in the UK has laid down "five principles of rewilding" which it expects to be followed by affiliated re-wilding projects. These are: 1: Support people and nature together; 2: Let nature lead; 3: Create resilient local economies; 4: Work at nature’s scale; 5: Secure benefits for the long-term. In practice rewilding as effected by private landowners and managers takes many different forms, with emphases placed on varying aspects. They may also refer to their activity using terminology other than "rewilding", possibly for political and diplomatic reasons, taking account of local sentiment or possible opposition. Examples include "Sanctuary Nature Recovery Programme" (at Broughton) and "nature restoration project", the preferred term used by the Cambrian Wildwood project, an area aspiring to encompass 7,000 acres in Wales.

Notable rewilding sites in England include:
 Knepp Castle. The 3,500 acre (1,400 hectare) Knepp Castle estate in West Sussex was the first major pioneer of re-wilding in England, and started that land-management policy there in 2001 on land formerly used as dairy farmland. (See  Knepp Wildland). Extremely rare species including common nightingale, turtle doves, peregrine falcons and purple emperor butterflies are now breeding at Knepp and populations of more common species are increasing. In 2019 a pair of white storks  built a nest in an oak tree at Knepp, part of a group imported from Poland, the result of a programme to re-introduce that species to England run by the Roy Dennis Wildlife Foundation, which has overseen reintroductions of other extinct bird species to the UK.
 Broughton Hall Estate, Yorkshire. In 2021 about 1,100 acres (a third of the estate) have been devoted to rewilding, with advice from Prof. Alastair Driver of Rewilding Britain.
 Mapperton Estate, Dorset. Another major estate to introduce re-wilding is the Mapperton Estate in Dorset, largely inspired by the work at Knepp. At Mapperton one of the five farms comprising the estate entered the process of re-wilding in 2021, accounting for 200 acres.

Rewilding Britain, a charity founded in 2015, aims to promote the rewilding of Great Britain. Celtic Reptile & Amphibian is a limited company established in 2020, with the aim of reintroducing extinct species of reptile and amphibian to Britain, as part of rewilding schemes, such as the European pond turtle, moor frog, agile frog, common tree frog and pool frog. Success has already been achieved with the captive breeding of the moor frog.

In 2020, nature writer Melissa Harrison reported a significant increase in attitudes supportive of rewilding among the British public, with plans recently approved for the release of European bison, Eurasian elk, and great bustard in England, along with calls to rewild as much as 20% of the land in East Anglia, and even return apex predators to the UK, such as the Eurasian lynx, brown bear, and grey wolf. More recently, academic work on rewilding in England has highlighted that support for rewilding is by no means universal. As in other countries, rewilding in England remains controversial to the extent that some of its more ambitious aims are being 'domesticated' both in a proactive attempt to make it less controversial and in reactive response to previous controversy.

Reforestation in England
Since the 1980s, 8.5 million trees have been planted in the United Kingdom in an area of the Midlands around the villages of Moira and Donisthorpe, close to Leicester. The area is called The National Forest. An even larger reforestation project, called The Northern Forest, is beginning in South Yorkshire. It aims to plant 50 million trees. Despite this, the UK government has been criticized for not achieving its tree planting goals. There have also been concerns of non-native tree planting disturbing the ecological integrity and processes of what would be a native habitat restoration.

The Netherlands 

This happened in line with Vera's proposal that grazing animals played a significant role in the shaping of European landscapes before the Neolithic, the wood-pasture hypothesis. Though not explicitly referred to as rewilding, nevertheless many of the goals and intentions of the project were in line with those of rewilding. The reserve is considered somewhat controversial due to the lack of predators and other native megafauna such as wolves, bears, lynx, elk, boar, and wisent. Between 800 and 1150 Konik ponies live in the Oostvaardersplassen. The horses were reintroduced together with Heck cattle and red deer to keep the landscape open by natural grazing. This provided habitat for geese who are key species in the wetlands of the area. The grazing of geese made it possible for reedbeds to remain and therefore conserved many protected birds species. This is a prime example how water and land ecosystems are connected and how reintroducing keystone species can conserve other protected species.

Pleistocene rewilding

Pleistocene rewilding was proposed by the Brazilian ecologist Mauro Galetti in 2004.  He suggested the introduction of elephants (and other proxies of extinct megafauna) from circuses and zoos to private lands in the Brazilian Cerrado and other parts of the Americas. In 2005, stating that much of the original megafauna of North America including mastodons, mammoths, ground sloths, and smilodons became extinct after the arrival of humans, Paul S. Martin proposed restoring the ecological balance by replacing them with species which have similar ecological roles, such as the Asian elephant, or the African elephants.

A reserve now exists for formerly captive elephants on the Brazilian Cerrado.

A controversial 2005 editorial in Nature, signed by a number of conservation biologists, took up the argument, urging that elephants, lions, and cheetahs could be reintroduced in protected areas in the Great Plains. The Bolson tortoise, discovered in 1959 in Durango, Mexico, was the first species proposed for this restoration effort, and in 2006 the species was reintroduced to two ranches in New Mexico owned by media mogul Ted Turner. Other proposed species include various camelids such as the Wild Bactrian camel, and various equids such as the Prezwalski's horse.

In 1988, researcher Sergey A. Zimov established Pleistocene Park in northeastern Siberia to test the possibility of restoring a full range of grazers and predators, with the aim of recreating an ecosystem similar to the one in which mammoths lived. Yakutian horses, reindeer, European bison, plains bison, Domestic yak, moose, and Bactrian camels were reintroduced, and reintroduction is also planned for saigas, wood bison, and Siberian tigers. The wood bison, a close relative of an ancient bison called the steppe bison that died out in Siberia 1000 or 2000 years ago, is also an important species for the ecology of Siberia. In 2006, 30 bison calves were flown from Edmonton, Alberta to Yakutsk and placed in the government-run reserve of Ust'-Buotama. This project remains controversial — a letter published in Conservation Biology accused the Pleistocene camp of promoting "Frankenstein ecosystems", stating that "the biggest problem is not the possibility of failing to restore lost interactions, but rather the risk of getting new, unwanted interactions instead."

Rewilding plants

In 1982 Daniel Janzen and Paul S. Martin originated the concept of evolutionary anachronism in a Science article published in 1982, titled "Neotropical Anachronisms: The Fruits the Gomphotheres Ate". Eighteen years later, Connie C. Barlow in her book The Ghosts of Evolution: Nonsensical Fruit, Missing Partners, and Other Ecological Anachronisms (2000), explored the specifics of temperate North American plants whose fruits displayed the characteristics of megafauna dispersal syndrome. Barlow noted that a consequence for such native fruits following the loss of their megafaunal seed dispersal partners was range constriction during the Holocene, made increasingly severe since the mid-20th century by rapid human-driven climate change. Additional details of range contraction were incorporated in Barlow's 2001 article, "Anachronistic Fruits and the Ghosts Who Haunt Them".

A plant species beset with anachronistic features whose range had already become so restricted that it warranted classification as a glacial relict is Torreya taxifolia. For this species, Barlow and Martin advocated for assisted migration poleward in an article published in Wild Earth in 2004, titled "Bring Torreya taxifolia North Now". In 2005 Barlow and Lee Barnes (co-founders of Torreya Guardians) began obtaining seeds from mature horticultural plantings in states northward of Florida and Georgia and distributing seeds to volunteer planters whose lands contained forested habitats potentially suitable for this native of Florida. Documentation of seed distribution and ongoing results, state by state, are publicly available on the Torreya Guardians website.) Articles published in Scientific American in 2009 and in Landscape Architecture Magazine in 2014 referred to the actions of Torreya Guardians as an example of "rewilding". Connie Barlow expressly referred to such efforts as "rewilding" in the 2020 book by Zach St. George, The Journeys of Trees. Her earliest reference to the term "rewilding" was in her 1999 essay, "Rewilding for Evolution", in Wild Earth. Because part of Barlow's personal seed plantings occurred on private land for which she did not expressly obtain planting permission, this form of rewilding action could be referred to as guerrilla rewilding, which is an adaptation of the established term guerrilla gardening. One example of guerrilla rewilding was reported in 2022. Himantoglossum robertianum is a tall orchid native to the Mediterranean Basin, but it is documented growing wild in Great Britain. As reported in The Guardian, "It is not believed these plants arrived naturally, but rather by someone scattering seeds about 15 years ago."

Criticism

Compatibility with economic activity
A view expressed by some national governments and officials within multilateral agencies such as the United Nations, is that excessive rewilding, such as large rigorously enforced protected areas where no extraction activities are allowed, can be too restrictive on people's ability to earn sustainable livelihoods. The alternative view is that increasing ecotourism can provide employment.

Farming 
Some farmers have been critical of rewilding for "abandoning productive farmland when the world's population is growing". Farmers have also attacked plans to reintroduce the lynx in the United Kingdom because of fears that reintroduction will lead to an increase in sheep predation.

Conflicts with animal rights and welfare 
Rewilding has been criticized by animal rights scholars, such as Dale Jamieson, who argues that "most cases of rewilding or reintroducing are likely to involve conflicts between the satisfaction of human preferences and the welfare of nonhuman animals." Erica von Essen and Michael Allen, using Donaldson and Kymlicka's political animal categories framework, assert that wildness standards imposed on animals are arbitrary and inconsistent with the premise that wild animals should be granted sovereignty over the territories that they inhabit and the right to make decisions about their own lives. To resolve this, Essen and Allen contend that rewilding needs to shift towards full alignment with mainstream conservation and welcome full sovereignty, or instead take full responsibility for the care of animals who have been reintroduced. Ole Martin Moen argues that rewilding projects should be brought to an end because they unnecessarily increase wild animal suffering and are expensive, and the funds could be better spent elsewhere.

Erasure of environmental history 
The environmental historian Dolly Jørgensen argues that rewilding, as it currently exists, "seeks to erase human history and involvement with the land and flora and fauna. Such an attempted split between nature and culture may prove unproductive and even harmful." She calls for rewilding to be more inclusive to combat this. Jonathan Prior and Kim J. Ward challenge Jørgensen's criticism and provide existing examples of rewilding programs which "have been developed and governed within the understanding that human and non-human world are inextricably entangled".

Harm to conservation 
Some conservationists have expressed concern that rewilding "could replace the traditional protection of rare species on small nature reserves", which could potentially lead to an increase in habitat fragmentation and species loss. David Nogués-Bravo and Carsten Rahbek assert that the benefits of rewilding lack evidence and that such programs may inadvertently lead to "de-wilding", through the extinction of local and global species. They also contend that rewilding programs may draw funding away from "more scientifically supported conservation projects".

See also 

 Conservation biology
 Conservation movement
 Climate change mitigation effects of rewilding
 Ecosystem service
 Ecotourism in Africa
 Environmental restoration
 Great Green Wall (Africa)
 Involuntary park
 Natural landscape
 Permaculture
 Reintroducing
 Sea rewilding
 Panthera Corporation
 Urban prairie
 Urban reforestation
 Wildlife management

References

Further reading
 Foreman, Dave (2004). Rewilding North America: A Vision for Conservation in the 21st Century, Island Press. 
 Fraser, Caroline (2010). Rewilding the World: Dispatches from the Conservation Revolution, Picador. 
 Pereira, Henrique M., & Navarro, Laetitia (2015). Rewilding European Landscapes, Springer. 
 MacKinnon, James Bernard (2013). The Once and Future World: Nature As It Was, As It Is, As It Could Be, Houghton Mifflin Harcourt. 
 Monbiot, George (2013). Feral: Rewilding the Land, the Sea, and Human Life, Penguin. 
 Monbiot, George (2022). Regenesis: Feeding the World without Devouring the Planet, Penguin Books. 
 Julien Louys (2014). "Rewilding the tropics, and other conservation translocations strategies in the tropical Asia-Pacific region"
 Meredith Root-Bernstein (2017) "Rewilding South America: Ten key questions"
 Tree, Isabella (2018), Wilding: The Return of Nature to a British Farm, Picador, 
 Wilson, Edward Osborne (2017). Half-Earth: Our Planet's Fight for Life, Liveright (W.W. Norton). 
 Wright, Susan (2018). SCOTLAND: A Rewilding Journey, Wild Media Foundation. 
 Thulin, Carl-Gustaf, & Röcklinsberg, Helena (2020). "Ethical Considerations for Wildlife Reintroductions and Rewilding".

External links

Projects 
 American Prairie Reserve
 Area de Conservacion Guanacaste, Costa Rica
 European Green Belt
 European Wildlife - European Centre of Biodiversity
 Gondwana Link
 Highlands Rewilding
 Lewa Wildlife Conservancy
 Peace Parks Foundation
 Pleistocene Park
 Rewilding Britain
 Rewilding Europe
 Rewilding Australia
 Rewilding Institute
 Self-willed land
 Scotland: The Big Picture
 Terai Arc Landscape Project (WWF) 
 Wildland Network UK
 Wildlands Network N. America (formerly Wildlands project)

Information 
 Rewilding the World: Dispatches from the Conservation Revolution
 "Rewilding the World: A Bright Spot for Biodiversity"
 Rewilding and Biodiversity: Complementary Goals for Continental Conservation, Michael Soulé & Reed Noss, Wild Earth, Wildlands Project Fall 1998
 
 "For more wonder, rewild the world", George Monbiot's July 2013 TED talk
 Bengal Tiger relocated to Sariska from Ranthambore | Times of India 

Animal reintroduction